This is a list of the wool, cotton and other textile mills in Huddersfield, Kirklees, West Yorkshire

Golcar (Colne Valley; Huddersfield)

Huddersfield

Lockwood (Huddersfield)

Longwood (Colne Valley;Huddersfield)

See also
Heavy Woollen District
Textile processing

References

Footnotes

The National Monument Record is a legacy numbering system maintained 
by English Heritage.

Notes

Bibliography

Huddersfield
Buildings and structures in Huddersfield
Huddersfield
Huddersfield
Huddersfield
History of the textile industry
Industrial Revolution in England